Eumicrotremus spinosus, commonly known as the Atlantic spiny lumpsucker, is a species of lumpfish native to the Arctic and North Atlantic.

Taxonomy
Eumicrotremus spinosus was first formally described as Cyclopterus spinosus in 1776 by the Danish zoologist Johan Christian Fabricius with its type locality given as Greenland. In 1862 the American biologist Theodore Gill proposed a new genus Eumicrotremus with Fabricius's Cyclopterus spinosus designated as its type species.

Description 
The Atlantic spiny lumpsucker is a small fish that reaches a maximum length of 13.2 cm (5.2 in). The species appears to be variable in color but typically ranges from brown to dull orange or red. It is a benthic fish that feeds on crustaceans, smaller fishes, and Oikopleura.

Distribution and habitat 
Atlantic spiny lumpsuckers are found in the Arctic and coastal parts of the North Atlantic. They are known from the Barents Sea, Svalbard, Franz Josef Land, Greenland, Iceland, Norway, the Hudson Bay, and the Canadian Arctic, as well as ranging south to Massachusetts. Within Canada, they have been reported from Quebec, the Northwest Territories, and Nunavut. They occur at depths of 30 to 400 m (98 to 1312 ft), where they are most frequently seen over and on stony bottoms.

In popular culture 
Atlantic spiny lumpsuckers are featured in the scuba diving video game Endless Ocean 2, which was released for the Wii. The species was not featured in the series' first game, nor did it appear in the Everblue series, which is often seen as a spiritual predecessor to the games. It is the only species of lumpfish to appear in either series.

References 

spinosus
Fish of the Arctic Ocean
Fish described in 1776
Taxa named by Johan Christian Fabricius